The Wen Ying Hall is a cultural center in North District, Taichung, Taiwan.

History
The center was established in October 1976 by entrepreneur He Yong and funded by the Taichung Wen Ying Foundation. In 1997, the second floor of the building was converted into the Special Exhibition Room for Traditional Taiwan Block Print.

Architecture
The design of the building is a mix blend between western and Chinese style. The building consists of Zhunzheng Auditorium, Traditional Taiwanese Woodblock Prints Special Collections Room, Wen Ying Gallery and Training Room.

Exhibition
The center houses more than 3,000 pieces of cultural and folk artifacts.

Transportation
The hall is accessible within walking distance north of Taichung Station of Taiwan Railways.

See also
 List of tourist attractions in Taiwan

References

1976 establishments in Taiwan
Cultural centers in Taichung